Inclusive growth is economic growth that raises standards of livings for broad swaths of a population. Proponents for inclusive growth warn that inequitable growth may have adverse political outcomes.

The definition of inclusive growth implies direct links between the macroeconomic and microeconomic determinants of the economy and economic growth. The microeconomic dimension captures the importance of structural transformation for economic diversification and competition, while the macro dimension refers to changes in economic aggregates such as the country’s gross national product (GNP) or gross domestic product (GDP), total factor productivity, and aggregate factor inputs.

Sustainable economic growth requires inclusive growth. Maintaining this is sometimes difficult because economic growth may give rise to negative externalities, such as a rise in corruption, which is a major problem in developing countries. Nonetheless, an emphasis on inclusiveness—especially on equality of opportunity in terms of access to markets, resources, and an unbiased regulatory environment—is an essential ingredient of successful growth. The inclusive growth approach takes a longer-term perspective, as the focus is on productive employment as a means of increasing the incomes of poor and excluded groups and raising their standards of living.

See also
Smart growth
Gross National Happiness
Sufficiency economy

References

Economic growth